Manasu Palike Mouna Raagam is a 2006 Telugu film produced by Dega Deva Kumar Reddy and directed by K. Nagabhushan starring Sneha and Vikramaditya. It was a women-oriented film. It was later dubbed to Tamil in the year 2009 as Yen Indha Mounam. The movie .

Plot
Gowri (Sneha) was an educated, cultured and beautiful young woman who lives happily along with her father in a village. But due to fate she loses her family in a hurricane and becomes an orphan. Rao (Sarath Babu), friend of her father takes her to his home in town and Gowri starts her new life among the complete strangers. She pretty much does all the work at their home though Chandna, wife of Rao doesn't approve of her much. Uma, Rao's daughter Uma marries Viswa, who later starts flirting with Gowri. When it becomes known to family, Gowri takes all the blame to avoid conflicts between the couple. But Viswa comes out and tells everyone that he was the one who started pursuing Gowri as his marital life wasn't good.

Everybody gets shocked to know that Uma and Viswa are planning to get divorced but Gowri advises marital counselling to avoid all that. To everyone's relief, Uma and Viswa manage their differences with the help of counselling and happily reconcile. Chandana, Rao's wife, gradually grows fond of her. Later their son Vikram (Vikramaditya) comes to visit them from abroad and Gowri gets impressed with him.

Later Rao's couple settles Gowri's marriage somewhere else without asking her consent. She halfheartedly agrees as she sees no interest for her on Vikram's side. But Vikram finds out that groom was a fraud and gets him arrested minutes before the wedding. Gowri becomes happy about that but Vikram still shows no interest for her. His parents arrange a match for him but girl leaves after listening to Vikram's proposal of staying together for some time before marriage. Later he comes to Gowri and tries to get physically intimate with her. She refuses and finally expresses her love for him. Vikram says that he wouldn't believe in all this love nonsense but Gowri explains him the sanctity and selfless nature of love. It impresses Vikram and mainly impresses Chandana who happens to overhear all this conservation. She gives her consent for their marriage and Gowri settles happily as daughter-in-law in that house.

Cast 
Sneha as Gowri
Vikramaditya as Vikram
Sarath Babu as Rao
Ambika as Jyothi
Aishwarya as Rani
Ahuti Prasad as Gowri's father
Raghavayya
Chandana as Chandana
L. B. Sriram
Suman Setty
Ramesh Khanna
Pandu

Soundtrack

References

External links

 Manasu Palike Mouna Raagam Review

2000s Telugu-language films
2006 films
Films scored by K. M. Radha Krishnan